The Ixcán River is a river in Guatemala. The river flows northwards from its sources in the Sierra de los Cuchumatanes in Huehuetenango, marks the border with El Quiché for a number of kilometers, and crosses the border with Mexico at 16.074929°N 91.107817°W where it flows into the Lacantún River, a tributary of the Usumacinta River. The Ixcán river basin covers an area of 2,085 square kilometres (805 sq mi) in Guatemala.[1]

The river has several different names. From its sources and downriver: Río Quisil, Río Naranjo, Río Cocola, Río Yula San Juan, and Río Ixcán.

References

External links
Map of Guatemala including the river

Rivers of Guatemala
Rivers of Mexico
Geography of Mesoamerica
International rivers of North America
Usumacinta River